The 1910 Nanyang industrial exposition (南洋勸業會) or more internationally known as the 1910 Nanking Exposition was the official world's fair held in Nanking, Qing China on June 5, 1910.

Name
The reason the Chinese name of the fair does not refer to Nanking directly, despite the event being held in Nanking, was because of the concept of Viceroy of Liangjiang.  At the time the Qing dynasty official Duan Fang had the title of Nanyang chancellor as well as governing the areas including Jiangsu, Jiangxi and Anhui.  Nanking belongs to Jiangsu geographically, but the fair was a "Nanyang region exposition" hence the name.  The Nanking area where the event was held was Jiangning District.

Organization
On December 15, 1908, Governor-General Tuan Fang of the Liang-Jiang Province and Governor Chen Qitai of Jiangsu Province submitted a petition to the Qing Court proposing that China host an international exposition.  It was an official fair backed by the Qing government.

A site of about 41 acres near San Pai Lou was established for the exhibition.  Along a main axis road were several exhibit buildings including the Administration Building, Fine Arts Building, Agriculture Building, Transportation Building, Foreign Exhibits Buildings, and then several buildings for the Chinese Provinces.  Exhibits came from all over China as well as Japan, Java, the United States, France, Great Britain, and Germany.

See also
 History of Shanghai expo

References

World's fairs in China
History of Nanjing
1910 in China
1910 festivals